Skopia (before 1928: Άνω Νεβόλιανη - Ano Nevoliani) is a village in Florina Regional Unit, Macedonia, Greece.

The Greek census (1920) recorded 1520 people in the village and in 1923 there were 350 inhabitants (or 59 families) who were Muslim. Following the Greek-Turkish population exchange, in 1926 within Ano Nevoliani there were 3 refugee families from East Thrace and 22 refugee families from Asia Minor. The Greek census (1928) recorded 1478 village inhabitants. In 1928, there were 20 refugee families (121 people). The village mosque was demolished in 1929.

References 

Populated places in Florina (regional unit)